Remingtonocetidae is a diverse family of early aquatic mammals of the order Cetacea. The family is named after paleocetologist Remington Kellogg.

Description
Remingtonocetids have long and narrow skulls with the external nare openings located on the front of the skull. Their frontal shields are narrow and their orbits small. Their mouth has a convex palate and an incompletely fused mandibular symphysis. The anterior teeth are flattened mediolaterally, making them appear shark-like.

In the postcranial skeleton, the cervical vertebrae are relatively long and the sacrum is composed of four vertebrae of which at least three are fused.  The acetabular notch is narrow or closed and on the femoral head the fovea is absent.

Cranial fossils are common but dental remains are rare.  The postcrania morphology is based entirely on a single specimen of Kutchicetus which was small and had a long and muscular back and tail.  Perhaps remintonocetids swam like the South American giant otter which swims with its long flat tail.

With long and low bodies, relatively short limbs, their elongated rostrum, remingtonocetids looked like mammalian crocodiles, more so than Ambulocetus.  They could both walk on land and swim in the water and most likely lived in a near-shore habitat.  At least one genus, Dalanistes, had a marine diet.

Remingtonocetids are often found in association with catfish and crocodilians, as well as protocetid whales and sirenians.  They were probably independent of freshwater.

Distribution
Remingtonocetidae was long considered endemic to the northern coastline of the ancient Tethys Ocean (in present day Pakistan and India) during the Eocene, but the discovery of Rayanistes in Egypt indicates that remingtonocetids had a broader distribution than previously thought.

Taxonomy

The name of the family was derived from the type genus Remingtonocetus, which was named after paleocetologist Remington Kellogg.

In 2009, paleontologists Thewissen & Bajpai proposed the subfamily Andrewsiphiinae for the genera Andrewsiphius and Kutchicetus.

Genera
Remingtonocetus (type) 
Andrewsiphius 
Attockicetus , the oldest genus
Dalanistes 
Kutchicetus 
Rayanistes Bebej, Zalmout, El-Aziz, Antar, and Gingerich, 2016

See also

 Evolution of cetaceans

Notes

References

 
 
 
 
 
 
 
 
 
 
 
 
 
 
 
 
 
  
 
 

 
Eocene first appearances
Eocene extinctions
Prehistoric mammal families